Callulops eremnosphax is a species of frog in the family Microhylidae. It is endemic to Papua New Guinea and only known from its type locality near Tekadu Airport in the Gulf Province. The specific name eremnosphax is derived from Greek eremnos meaning "dark" and sphax meaning "throat".

Description
The snout is rounded. The eyes are moderately large. The tympanum is indistinct and rather small. The fingers have small discs, those of the toes are slightly larger. No webbing is present. The head and dorsum are uniform dark chocolate brown. The upper flanks are noticeably lighter brown, and the coloration gradually turns to light gray-brown towards the venter. The chin and the throat are dark brown. The rest of the venter is light gray-brown, albeit possibly with brown stippling reducing the contrast with the darker anterior parts. The iris is dark brown.

The male advertisement call consists of 6–10 barking notes.

Habitat and conservation
Males call from elevated sites at the base of trees. As of late 2020, this species has not been assessed for the IUCN Red List of Threatened Species.

References

eremnosphax
Amphibians of New Guinea
Amphibians of Papua New Guinea
Endemic fauna of New Guinea
Endemic fauna of Papua New Guinea
Amphibians described in 2009
Taxa named by Allen Allison
Taxa named by Edward Frederick Kraus